United Nations Security Council resolution 1477, adopted unanimously on 29 April 2003, after recalling resolutions  955 (1994), 1165 (1998), 1329 (2000), 1411 (2002) and 1431 (2002), the Council forwarded a list of nominees for permanent judges at the International Criminal Tribunal for Rwanda (ICTR) to the General Assembly for consideration.

The list of 35 nominees received by the Secretary-General Kofi Annan was as follows:

 Achta Saker Abdoul (Chad)
 Aydin Sefa Akay (Turkey)
 Florence Rita Arrey (Cameroon)
 Abdoulaye Barry (Burkina Faso)
 Miguel Antonio Bernal (Panama)
 Solomy Balungi Bossa (Uganda)
 Robert Fremr (Czech Republic)
 Silvio Guerra Morales (Panama)
 Taghreed Hikmat (Jordan)
 Karin Hökborg (Sweden)
 Vagn Joensen (Denmark)
 Gberdao Gustave Kam (Burkina Faso)
 Joseph-Médard Kaba Kashala Katuala (Democratic Republic of the Congo)
 Engera A. Kileo (Tanzania)
 Nathalia P. Kimaro (Tanzania)
 Agnieszka Klonowiecka-Milart (Poland)
 Flavia Lattanzi (Italy)
 Kenneth Machin (United Kingdom)
 Joseph Edward Chiondo Masanche (Tanzania)
 Patrick Matibini (Zambia)
 Edouard Ngarta Mbaïouroum (Chad)
 Antoine Kesia-Mbe Mindua (Democratic Republic of the Congo)
 Tan Sri Dato Hj. Mohd. Azmi Dato Hj. Kamaruddin (Malaysia)
 Lee Gacuiga Muthoga (Kenya)
 Laurent Ngaoundi (Chad)
 Beradingar Ngonyame (Chad)
 Daniel David Ntanda Nsereko (Uganda)
 Seon Ki Park (South Korea)
 Tatiana Răducanu (Moldova)
 Mparany Mamy Richard Rajohnson (Madagascar)
 Edward Mukandara K. Rutakangwa (Tanzania)
 Emile Francis Short (Ghana)
 Albertus Henricus Joannes Swart (Netherlands)
 Xenofon Ulianovschi (Moldova)
 Aura Emérita Guerra de Villalaz (Panama)

18 of the judges would be selected to serve at the Tribunal, which, at the time, was expected to complete its work in 2008.

See also
 List of United Nations Security Council Resolutions 1401 to 1500 (2002–2003)
 Rwandan genocide

References

External links
 
Text of the Resolution at undocs.org

 1477
2003 in Rwanda
 1477
April 2003 events